Stephanie Raymond (born January 15, 1985) is a former professional basketball player who played for the Chicago Sky of the WNBA. She scored a total of 61 points in 20 games with the Sky.

Northern Illinois statistics

Source

References

External links
NIU bio

1985 births
Living people
American women's basketball players
Basketball players from Illinois
Chicago Sky draft picks
Chicago Sky players
Guards (basketball)
Northern Illinois Huskies women's basketball players
Sportspeople from Rockford, Illinois